Yazagyo (also Yazagya and Yarzagyo) is the northernmost village in Kale Township, Kale District, of western Burma (Myanmar).

Notes

External links
 "Yazagyo Map — Satellite Images of Yazagyo" Maplandia World Gazetteer. Note, Maplandia incorrectly places Yazagyo in Chin State, but see "Map of Sagaing Division (Lower), Myanmar" Myanmar Information Management Unit (MIMU), map ID: MIMU270v01, creation date: 5 Aug 2010 and  Burma 1:250,000 topographic map, Series U542, NF 46-03, Mawlaik U.S. Army Map Service, March 1960

Populated places in Kale District
Kale Township